Oirata taklamakanus is a moth of the family Pterophoridae. It is found in Turkey.

References

Moths described in 1995
Pterophorini
Endemic fauna of Turkey
Moths of Asia